"A Stripe for Frazer" is a missing episode of the British television comedy series Dad's Army. It was originally transmitted on 29 March 1969. Of the three missing Dad's Army episodes (all from the second series) it is the only one to have been reconstructed using animation.

Synopsis
Frazer is promoted to Lance Corporal, and battles with Jones for further promotion.

Plot
When Captain Bailey informs Mainwaring that he can make up another lance corporal, Frazer is chosen. Jones and Frazer both try desperately to impress Mainwaring into making them a corporal, and Frazer issues many charge sheets. The episode ends with Frazer breaking into Mainwaring's office with a boat-hook.

Cast

Arthur Lowe as Captain Mainwaring
John Le Mesurier as Sergeant Wilson
Clive Dunn as Lance Corporal Jones
John Laurie as Private Frazer
James Beck as Private Walker
Arnold Ridley as Private Godfrey
Ian Lavender as Private Pike
Geoffrey Lumsden as Corporal-Colonel Square
John Ringham as Captain Bailey
Gordon Peters as Police Officer
Edward Sinclair as Caretaker

Status

This episode is one of three missing Dad's Army episodes after the tapes were wiped by the BBC for reuse. The other two are "The Loneliness of the Long Distance Walker" and "Under Fire".

Animation
In November 2008 the soundtrack of this episode was returned to the BBC and, in 2016, the BBC released an animated version of the episode via its BBC Store online service. This version of the episode used the original 1969 audio with new hand-drawn animation synchronised to the soundtrack.

Remake
UKTV Gold commissioned recreations of all three missing episodes. The remake of this episode was first broadcast on 26 August 2019. The new cast are:

Kevin McNally as Captain Mainwaring
Robert Bathurst as Sergeant Wilson
Kevin Eldon as Lance Corporal Jones
David Hayman as Private Frazer
Mathew Horne as Private Walker
Timothy West as Private Godfrey
Tom Rosenthal as Private Pike
David Horovitch as Corporal-Colonel Square
William Andrews as Captain Bailey
John Biggins as the Verger
Jack Barry as the policeman

Broadcast
The second series was scheduled originally to be broadcast in January 1969. Instead, the BBC decided to repeat the first series in January 1969 because they believed many people had missed the series when it had started in the summer of 1968. Consequently, 'A Stripe for Frazer' was originally planned for transmission on 27 January 1969, but was delayed until 29 March 1969. It was repeated on 5 September 1969.

Radio episode
The radio version of this episode was adapted by Michael Knowles and Harold Snoad and was first broadcast on 18 March 1974.

References

Further reading

External links

     

Dad's Army radio episodes
Dad's Army missing episodes
Dad's Army (series 2) episodes
1969 British television episodes